Events from the year 2016 in Kazakhstan

Incumbents
 President: Nursultan Nazarbayev
 Prime minister: Karim Massimov (until 8 September) Bakhytzhan Sagintayev (from 9 September)

Events

March 
20 March – Legislative elections were held in the country in accordance with the date set by president Nursultan Nazarbayev. Nur Otan won the election with over 82% of the vote.

June 
5 – 10 June – A series of shootings on civilian and military targets occurred in Aktobe, Kazakhstan, resulting in 7 deaths and 37 others injured. Eighteen attackers were killed and nine were arrested.

July 
18 July – Ruslan Kulikbayev, a 26-year-old Salafi jihadist and ex-convict, shot and killed 10 people, including 8 police officers and 2 civilians, at a police station in Almaty, Kazakhstan before being apprehended in a chase and shootout with law enforcement.

August 
5 – 21 August – Kazakhstan competed at the 2016 Summer Olympics with 104 competitors in 17 sports. The country won a total of 18 Olympic medals (3 gold, 5 silver, 10 bronze), its most successful outcome in Summer Olympic history.

September 
9 September – Bakhytzhan Sagintayev took the office of prime minister.

Deaths

10 September – Pyotr Devyatkin, ice hockey player (b. 1977).

References

 
Years of the 21st century in Kazakhstan
Kazakhstan
Kazakhstan
Kazakhstan
2010s in Kazakhstan